Omorgus triestinae is a species of hide beetle in the subfamily Omorginae.

References

triestinae
Beetles described in 1987